Marek Čiliak (born 2 April 1990) is a Slovak professional ice hockey goaltender who currently playing for HC Kometa Brno of the Czech Extraliga (ELH).

Playing career
Čiliak made his Czech Extraliga debut playing for Kometa Brno during the 2012–13 Czech Extraliga season.

In his second stint with Brno, Čiliak appeared in 6 seasons before leaving following the 2017–18 season, opting to sign a one-year contract in the Kontinental Hockey League (KHL) with Slovak club, HC Slovan Bratislava, on May 30, 2018.

In the 2018–19 season, Čiliak was given starting goaltender duties, collecting just 6 wins through 28 games for Bratislava. With the club out of playoff contention, on January 31, 2019, he terminated his contract and returned for a third stint with Kometa Brno for the remainder of the season. After 8 games with Brno, prior to the commencement of the post-season, Čiliak was signed to a two-year contract extension to remain with Brno on March 11, 2019.

References

External links

 

1990 births
Living people
Slovak ice hockey goaltenders
HK 91 Senica players
Hokej Šumperk 2003 players
HC Kometa Brno players
HK Nitra players
Orli Znojmo players
SK Horácká Slavia Třebíč players
HC Slovan Bratislava players
PSG Berani Zlín players
Sportspeople from Zvolen
Motor České Budějovice players
HK Poprad players
Slovak expatriate ice hockey players in the Czech Republic